Yakimovo is a rural locality (a village) in Nikolskoye Rural Settlement, Kaduysky District, Vologda Oblast, Russia. The population was 2 as of 2002. There are 4 streets.

Geography 
Yakimovo is located 8 km southeast of Kaduy (the district's administrative centre) by road. Dubrovnoye is the nearest rural locality.

References 

Rural localities in Kaduysky District